The Following is a List of Flags used in South Sudan.

National Flag

Government Flag

Ethnic Group Flags

Military Flags

Political Party Flags

Proposed Flags

Sub-National flag

Historical flag

Ottoman Empire (Turkish Sudan)

Mahdist State

Belgian Empire

Anglo-Egyptian Sudan

Under Sudan

See also 

 Flag of South Sudan
 Coat of arms of South Sudan

References 

Lists and galleries of flags
Flags
National symbols of South Sudan